Mohammad Ibrahim Saaduddin, better known as Moh Saaduddin, was a peace activist and a Maranao journalist who wrote for The Manila Times and the Mindanao Examiner in the Philippines. He wrote about current events and positive developments in Mindanao, particularly in Maguindanao province from 2014 to 2018 with his brother, Jii Saaduddin, a social engineer consultant.. He authored investigative reports about events relating to the Daesh-Inspired group in the southern Philippines known as the Maute group in Lanao del Sur, Philippines. He was also a provincial information officer of the Province of Maguindanao last October 8, 2019.

Saaduddin died on October 8, 2018, in a motorcycle accident along the road in Matalam, North Cotabato going to Kidapawan City. The accident happened after he covered an event in the Regional Office of the Autonomous Region in Muslim Mindanao in Cotabato City, Philippines.

Early life 
In 2002, Saaduddin graduated from high school at Jamiatu Muslim Mindanao. In April 2006, he earned a Bachelor of Science in International Relations (BSIR) at Mindanao State University. After a year, he married Anisah Macabalang, the eldest daughter of Ali G. Macabalang. From 2007 to 2012, he worked abroad as an English-Arabic translator for Kamel Bashir Legal Translation in the United Arab Emirates.

He had two sisters and three brothers. He had three daughters and two sons. His eldest son, Mohammad Jr., died at the age of three in 2009 caused by asthma.

Journalism 
Saaduddin's desire to become a journalist began in his college years. As a journalist he encountered difficulties in the Philippines that spurred him to write about what he saw as differences between the Islamic Way of Life and the ideology of the Maute group, Ansar Khilafa Philippines, Bangsamoro Islamic Freedom Fighters and Abu Sayyaf.

Saaduddin had interviewed extremists from the southern Philippines with European journalist Lennart Hofman of De Correspondent. He took responsibility for the safety of European journalists during their reporting in September 2018 in Patikul, Sulu, Philippines. His activities sought to bring about peace in troubled areas in Mindanao.

References 

1985 births
2018 deaths
Filipino journalists
Filipino Muslims
Mindanao State University alumni
Marawi
Road incident deaths in the Philippines